Haiti competed at the 2014 Summer Youth Olympics, in Nanjing, China from 16 August to 28 August 2014.

Athletics

Haiti qualified two athletes.

Qualification Legend: Q=Final A (medal); qB=Final B (non-medal); qC=Final C (non-medal); qD=Final D (non-medal); qE=Final E (non-medal)

Boys
Track & road events

Girls
Field events

Judo

Haiti was given a quota to compete by the tripartite committee.

Individual

Team

References

2014 in Haitian sport
Nations at the 2014 Summer Youth Olympics
Haiti at the Youth Olympics